The Real-time Control System (RCS) is a software system developed by NIST based on the Real-time Control System Reference Model Architecture, that implements a generic Hierarchical control system. The RCS Software Library is an archive of free C++, Java and Ada code, scripts, tools, makefiles, and documentation developed to aid programmers of software to be used in real-time control systems (especially those using the Reference Model Architecture for Intelligent Systems Design).

Introduction 
RCS has been used in automated manufacturing, robotics, and automated vehicle research at NIST.  The software consists of a C++ library and GUI and configuration tools written in a variety of software languages. The Software Library is offering the following RCS tools:
 RCS Java-based Diagnostics Tool : A tool written as a java applet that allows programmers to see the status and send commands to any RCS module.
 RCS Java-based Diagnostics Tool Instructions : Instructions on how to build applications for use with the diagnostics tool.
 RCS-Design Tool : A tool written as a java applet that allows programmers to create RCS applications graphically and generates source code.
 RCS-Design Tool Instructions : Instructions on how to build applications with the RCS-Design tool.
 RCS Data Plotter : A Java applet which plots data on a cartesian or polar graph, read either in real-time or from a text file.
 Socket Interface to NML : Describes how to connect to an NML server using sockets directly. This information should also be useful for other languages where the C++ NML client interface is not available.
 RCS Posemath Library : A library of classes for representing positions, rotations, and translations in a variety of coordinate systems and the functions to add/subtract/multiply/divide/convert them. For more info on posemath you may also want to check out: Karl Murphy's Posemath Examples
 RCS Library Lower Level Utilities : Describes many of the lower level utilities used to create the NODE, CMS, and NML components of the RCS Library but which may be useful on their own. Includes timers, semaphores, linked-lists, printing, and windows functions.
 RCS Library Installation Instructions : Provides instructions for getting and making the RCS Library.
 RCS Library Version Functions : Documentation for some functions for determining at run-time which version of the RCS library your using.

RCS applications 
 Robocrane - RCS controlled a crane having six degrees of freedom. It incorporated tactile, proximity and vision sensors.
 Next Generation Inspection System - RCS controlled a Coordinate Measuring Machine, with sensors including analog touch probes, video camera, and laser rangefinder.
Intelligent Autonomous Vehicles - RCS controlled a group of autonomous vehicles, at a high level coordinating their movements, and a low level controlling their steering, throttle and brakes.  Sensors included an Inertial navigation system and differential GPS.
 Enhanced Machine Controller, or EMC - an NIST research project in CNC software that uses RCS.

See also 
 Hierarchical control system
 4D-RCS Reference Model Architecture

References

Further reading 
 Albus, J. S. 4-D/RCS reference model architecture for unmanned ground vehicles. In G Gerhart, R Gunderson, and C Shoemaker, editors, Proceedings of the SPIE AeroSense Session on Unmanned Ground Vehicle Technology, volume 3693, pages 11–20, Orlando,
 Albus, J. S. The NIST Real-Time Control System, An Applications Survey
 Gazi, V., Moore, M. L., Passino, K. M., Shackleford, W. P., Proctor, F. M., Albus, J. S., The RCS Handbook, Tools for Real-Time Control Systems Software Development, John Wiley and Sons, New York, 2001.

External links 
 RCS Overview
 NIST Real-Time Control Systems (RCS) Library: Tools for Control System Development
 RCS software library

Control engineering
Control System Software